Fourstones is a former railway station which served the villages of Fourstones and Newbrough in Northumberland between 1837 and 1967 on the Tyne Valley Line.

History 
The station opened in January 1837 by the Newcastle and Carlisle Railway. It was closed to both passengers and goods traffic on 2 January 1967.

References

External links 
 

Disused railway stations in Northumberland
Former North Eastern Railway (UK) stations
Railway stations in Great Britain opened in 1837
Railway stations in Great Britain closed in 1967
1839 establishments in England
1967 disestablishments in England
Beeching closures in England